Cymothoe eris is a butterfly in the family Nymphalidae. It is found in the Republic of the Congo and the Democratic Republic of the Congo.

Subspecies
Cymothoe eris eris (Congo, Democratic Republic of the Congo: Ubangi)
Cymothoe eris capellides Holland, 1920 (Democratic Republic of the Congo: Uele, Tshopo, Maniema)
Cymothoe eris sankuruana Overlaet, 1952 (Democratic Republic of the Congo: south-central to Sankuru)

References

Butterflies described in 1896
Cymothoe (butterfly)
Butterflies of Africa
Taxa named by Per Olof Christopher Aurivillius